Eduardo Pedro Brandão de Melo de Magalhães Guedes de Queiroz (born 29 July 1936) is a Portuguese former sailor who competed in the 1964 Summer Olympics.

References

1936 births
Living people
Portuguese male sailors (sport)
Olympic sailors of Portugal
Sailors at the 1964 Summer Olympics – Dragon